Eleutherodactylus paulsoni is a species of frog in the family Eleutherodactylidae. It is endemic to the Tiburon Peninsula, Haiti. 
It is a terrestrial frog. It is typically found in association with caves or creek beds located in closed forest, from sea level to  asl. Habitat loss caused by logging and agriculture is threat to this species. It is known from the Pic Macaya National Park, but habitat degradation is occurring in the park too.

References

paulsoni
Frogs of Haiti
Endemic fauna of Haiti
Amphibians described in 1964
Taxonomy articles created by Polbot